Wei Yang FAcSS FRTPI MCIHT (born April 1974) is a Chinese-British town planner and urban designer, an author and a scholar. She is the founder of Wei Yang & Partners in London. She is a lead figure in researching, promoting and implementing the 21st Century Garden City approach and promoting joined up thinking between different built and nature environment professionals.

Yang was President of the Royal Town Planning Institute for 2021.  She champions a revival of spirit for a modernised planning profession to tackle the global challenges in a systematic way, and thus to achieve collective wellbeing and fulfilment for all. 

Yang is an Honorary Professor of University College London. She is the Deputy Chair of Construction Industry Council, a board member of the British Library,  and a member of UN Habitat World Urban Campaign Steering Committee.

Early life and education
Wei Yang was born in Beijing. She studied urban planning at Xi'an University of Architecture and Technology gaining a bachelor's degree in 1996. Between 1996 and 1997, she volunteered in Chinese vernacular architecture Research Group led by renowned architectural historian and Tsinghua University professor Chen Zhihua.

From 1999 to 2005, Yang studied at the University of Sheffield, and obtained a master of science degree in 2001 and a doctor of philosophy degree in 2005 from the School of Architecture. Her PhD research was part of an EU-funded project: Rediscovering the Urban Realm and Open Spaces (RUROS).

Career
In 2004, while writing up her PhD thesis, Yang pursued her planning career in Britain in a Milton Keynes based planning practice David Lock Associates. In 2011, she founded Wei Yang & Partners in London, which provides integrated master planning solutions and promotes best practices worldwide. In particular, the practice supports and fosters knowledge transfer between practice and research.

In 2011, Yang initiated self-funded research on 21st Century Garden City, which captures the essence of the original Garden City ideas, but adapts them to a more complex, 21st century context, promoting sustainability, tackling climate change and utilising smart technologies. The initiative was well ahead of the UK government's Garden City Proposal in 2014. The research had led to the success of Wei Yang & Partners in winning the Wolfson Economics Finalist Prize in 2014. The competition final report, New Garden Cities: Visionary, Economically Viable and Popular was referred to in The Lyons Housing Review: Mobilising Across the Nation to Build the Homes our Children Need. In the field of practical work, Wei Yang & Partners have delivered many master planning projects in the UK and China utilising 21st Century Garden City approach.

Yang is also a key figure in promoting green & low-carbon development approach in China. From 2013 to 2016, she served as the Co-Chair of the UK-China Eco-Cities & Green Building Group. Between 2013 and 2014, she was seconded by the UK Foreign and Commonwealth Office (FCO) as British Principal Planning Expert to advise the Chinese Ministry of Housing & Urban-Rural Development (MoHURD) on sustainable urbanisation. She also gave expert advice to Progressing Eco-City Policies into Mainstream Practice in China project in 2012, and ‘the Europe-China Eco-Cities Link (EC-Link)’ project in 2013. From 2015 to 2017, she led the UK-China pilot project on ‘the Green & Low-Carbon Development of Small Towns in China’, and was the lead author of The Technical Manual for Green & Low-Carbon Development of Small Towns in China.

In 2014, Yang was elected as a World Cities Summit Young Leader by Singapore, and was named as the Planner's Women of Influence in 2017, 2018.

In 2017, recognising her innovative work and actions in promoting joined up thinking between different built environment professionals[3], she was conferred as a Fellow of Academy of Social Sciences (AcSS). In 2018, she was conferred as a Fellow of the Royal Town Planning Institute (RTPI). In May 2019, she was appointed as a board member of the British Library by the Secretary of State for Digital, Culture, Media & Sport.

In September 2019, Yang was elected by RTPI members as vice president for 2020. In her Manifesto, she stated that ‘I want to champion a revival of spirit for our profession by enhancing public appreciation, strengthening international collaboration on capacity building, and contributing to immediate actions on the climate and biodiversity emergency. I am also keen to do more to engage young planners and adopt new technologies to empower the modernisation.’

In August 2020, a number of suggestions Yang made to the Chinese Ministry of Natural Resources was adopted in their consultation paper - Planning Guidance for Metropolitan Areas (August 2020) including: 'A strategic and long-term urban-rural integrated approach; A single digital base map containing all natural, ecological, socio-economic, demographic, cultural & heritage, infrastructure, pollution, agricultural, climate change impact, and hazards information; An emphasis on the public service purpose of planning and strengthening public engagement; Urban design and place-making to be embedded in the whole plan-making process; Integration of a blue & green landscape framework in urban developments, bringing the beauty of nature into cities, developing distinctive local characters; Creating pedestrian friendly walkable neighbourhoods, and human-scale public open spaces.'

Yang was inaugurated as RTPI President on 20 January 2021. In her Presidential Inaugural Address, Yang said ‘The fundamental objective of the planning profession is to create a balanced system for People, Nature and Society to co-exist in harmony’; ‘I believe compassion and selflessness are the moral foundations of our profession’; 'We need a reimagining of planning, thinking beyond professional boundaries and beyond the present day'. 

Yang formed Digital Task Force for Planning in early 2021 with Professor Michael Batty, Chairman of Centre for Advanced Spatial Analysis, University College London. The mission of the Task Force is to promote an integrated digitally informed approach to Town & Country Planning. The Task Force examined 'how the planning profession and its education can embrace the digital revolution in a more thorough and proactive way to empower planners with new skills to tackle the grand challenges of our times for public interest'.  The Task Force Report, A Digital Future for Planning – Spatial Planning Reimagined (Batty & Yang, 2022)  outlined blueprint for digital transformation of spatial planning and the sector’s future. Keen for a shift to a ‘whole systems’ approach to tackle the grand challenges, the report put digitally enabled spatial planning at the forefront.  Emphasis is placed on planners' leadership and collaboration with like-minded professionals across the built and natural environment sectors to achieve common goals. 

Yang co-authored Humanistic Pure Land and Garden Cities (2021) with Venerable Ru Chuang, Director of Fo Guang Shan Buddha Museum during 2020 COVID19 lockdown. Venerable Ru Chuang wrote Humanistic Pure Land; Yang wrote Garden Cities.  The book revealed the moral connections between the philosophies of Garden Cities and Humanistic Buddhism. The book became Taiwan best seller number one after its publication in November 2021.  The income of the book was donated to Fo Guang Shan Education Foundation to fund education for children from disadvantaged background.

Yang is an Honorary Professor at University College London. She was elected as the Deputy Chair of Construction Industry Council (CIC) in June 2022. She will be the first female Chair in CIC’s 34 year history. Yang was also elected as a member of UN Habitat World Urban Campaign Steering Committee in 2022.

Current affiliations
 Chairman, Wei Yang & Partners 
Immediate Past President, the Royal Town Planning Institute
Co-Chair, Digital Task Force for Planning
Board Member, the British Library
 Deputy Chair, Construction Industry Council
 Honorary Professor, University College London

Memberships and fellowships
 Fellow of the Academy of Social Sciences (AcSS), elected in 2017
 Fellow of the Royal Town Planning Institute (RTPI), elected in 2018 (Member of RTPI since 2012)
 Member of the Chartered Institution of Highways and Transportation (CIHT), elected in 2009
 Royal Institute of British Architects (RIBA) Client Adviser, appointed in 2011
 Academician of the Academy of Urbanism (AOU), appointed in 2009

Past roles
 CABE Enabler (2009–2011)
 Member of the Editorial Advisory Panel of the Proceedings of the Institution of Civil Engineers: Urban Design and Planning (2011–2014)
 Member of the Royal Town Planning Institute Membership Panel (2012–2016)
 Co-Chair of the UK-China Eco-Cities & Green Building Group (2013–2016)
 Vice chair of the Royal Town Planning Institute International Committee (2017–2019)
Vice president of the Royal Town Planning Institute (2020)
President of the Royal Town Planning Institute (2021) 
Board Trustee, the Landscape Institute (2018-2022)
 Board Trustee, Milton Keynes City Discovery Centre (2010-2022)

References

1974 births
Alumni of the University of Sheffield
British urban planners
Chinese emigrants to England
Chinese urban planners
Fellows of the Academy of Social Sciences
Living people
People from Beijing
Women urban planners
Xi'an University of Architecture and Technology alumni
Presidents of the Royal Town Planning Institute